Hyposmocoma papahanau is a species of moth of the family Cosmopterigidae. It is endemic to Nihoa, Northwestern Hawaiian Islands. The type locality is Miller Canyon.

The wingspan is about 8.8 mm.

The larval case is burrito-shaped and 4.5–8.7 mm in length. It is similar to that of Hyposmocoma nihoa.

Adults were reared from case-making larvae. Larvae were collected on the ground.

External links
New species of Hyposmocoma (Lepidoptera, Cosmopterigidae) from the remote Northwestern Hawaiian Islands of Laysan, Necker, and Nihoa

papahanau
Endemic moths of Hawaii
Moths described in 2009